Robert Victor Charles Robins (born 13 March 1935) is a former English cricketer and insurance executive. He is the eldest son of Walter Robins, who played Test cricket for England in the 1930s.

Career
Charles Robins was born in Burnham, Buckinghamshire, and was educated at Eton College, where he was a successful schoolboy cricketer and captained the First XI in 1953. He played first-class cricket for Middlesex as a right-handed batsman and a leg-break-googly bowler between 1953 and 1960, and later captained the county Second XI.

His best first-class bowling figures were 7 for 78 in Middlesex's victory over Cambridge University in 1954. In the County Championship his best figures were 6 for 40 against Yorkshire in 1958.

He followed his father onto the Middlesex General Committee and he has given many years of distinguished service. He was a successful Chairman of Cricket for 13 years and he succeeded Michael Sturt as the County Chairman (1994–1996). He was inducted into the Middlesex County Cricket Club Hall of Fame. He served as the President of the County Club for two years (2005–2007). He also led a successful insurance career with Stafford Knight for many years.

References

External links

1935 births
Living people
Free Foresters cricketers
Middlesex cricketers
Presidents of Middlesex County Cricket Club
Chairmen of Middlesex County Cricket Club
People educated at Eton College
People from Burnham, Buckinghamshire
English cricketers
Buckinghamshire cricketers
Gentlemen cricketers
Marylebone Cricket Club cricketers
D. R. Jardine's XI cricketers